Mahanadi River Delta in India is a basin of deposit that drains a large land mass of the Indian subcontinent into the Bay of Bengal. The alluvial valley is wide and relatively flat with a meandering river channel that changes its course.

It deposits more silt than almost any other river in the Indian subcontinent.

The area of the drainage basin is 141,464 km2. The interior coastal plain has a relatively low elevation. The average elevation of the drainage basin is 426 m, with a maximum of 877 m and a minimum of 193 m.

Population density
The upper part of the delta plain is heavily populated. The population density exceeds 36 people per square kilometre, although moving toward the coast the population density falls.

The climate in the area is primarily sub-tropical. Rainfall comes predominantly from the summer monsoon (June through September). The average annual rainfall in the basin is 1,463 mm. Rainfall is extremely low during the rest of the year, rarely exceeding 30 mm per month.

Notes

External links
 Mahanadi River Delta on East Coast of India
 Flood Forecasting and Inundation Mapping in the Mahanadi River Basin: A Collaborative Effort between India and the United States
 Nasa view of Mahanadi River Delta

Mahanadi River
Landforms of Odisha
River deltas of Asia
Geography of Bhubaneswar